Robert Newell Groner (September 13, 1876 – January 18, 1930) was an American football coach. 
He was the third head football coach at the Virginia Military Institute (VMI), serving for one season, in 1897, and compiling a record of 3–2.

Head coaching record

References

External links
 

1876 births
1930 deaths
VMI Keydets football coaches
University of Virginia alumni